Wincanton plc is a British provider of logistics with its origins in milk haulage. The company provides transport and logistics services including specialist automated high bay, high capacity warehouses, and supply chain management for businesses. It also provides container transportation and storage, warehousing solutions and related services, such as health and safety, IT services and people transition to numerous industries.

Wincanton's specialist markets include retail, consumer goods, construction, dairy, defence, industrial, fuels and energy. It is listed on the London Stock Exchange, and is a former constituent of the FTSE 250 Index.

History
Wincanton was founded in 1925, as Wincanton Transport & Engineering Ltd, a subsidiary of the West Surrey Central Dairy Company, a company which has since been known as Cow & Gate, Unigate and then Uniq.

In the 1970s, Wincanton diversified into new market sectors including petroleum and developed temperature controlled operations for the transportation of food stuffs and refrigerated goods. In the 1990s, Wincanton merged with Unigate Chilled Distribution, and entered the retail market, through the acquisition of Glass Glover in February 1993. In March 2001, Wincanton plc demerged from Uniq, and was listed on the London Stock Exchange.

In November 2008, Wincanton acquired the CEL Group.

In November 2015, Wincanton sold its records management business (WRM) to Restore for approximately £55.7m to reduce its average net indebtedness, and allow room for growth. In February 2016, Wincanton partnered with Magnet Kitchens to produce forty four new double decker articulated trailers which was an investment of £2 million.

In March 2016, Wincanton launched EnergyLink, a network based in the United Kingdom to support greater flexibility in delivery services for the energy sector.

In April 2016, Wincanton gained further growth of its operations at the Port of Southampton after moving to a new base and investing in new equipment, supported by extra rail capacity. In June 2016, Wincanton renewed its distribution deal with J Sainsburys PLC for an additional five years. The business has been a customer of Wincanton for the past twenty one years.

In July 2016, Wincanton renewed a contract with The Co-operative Group for a further five years, which brings the contract to twenty five years. As part of the agreement, around seven hundred staff of Wincanton and a fleet of more than five hundred vehicles will support the Co Op, by making around 130k journeys each year to as many as 1,000 stores of the Co-op across the United Kingdom.

In October 2019, Wincanton plc expressed an interest in merging with Eddie Stobart. Wincanton, later withdrew their offer, saying that it had “yet to receive full disclosure of the information requested to enable it to complete its due diligence exercise”.

Headquarters 
The company's origins are in Wincanton, Somerset, although the head office is now based in Methuen Park, Chippenham, Wiltshire.

Operations
Wincanton currently directly employs in the region of 20,000 people across the United Kingdom and Ireland through a network of over two hundred sites. As of 2016, the Wincanton fleet comprises over 3,400 vehicles including conventional trucks and trailers, as well as a range of specialist equipment including skeletal trailers, tankers and construction vehicles.

Services 
Wincanton offers road transport and distribution, container logistics, specialist transport to construction sites, tankers for all liquid and powder products, including petroleum and lubricants, home delivery and fleet management and vehicle maintenance through its subsidiary business, Pullman Fleet Services. Wincanton offers dedicated and shared user warehousing, bonded warehousing and other services.

These include co-packing, automation, fulfilment, off-quay solutions, returns management, recycling and packaging. Wincanton also offers integrated IT services, change management and people transition (TUPE) services.

References

Companies based in Wiltshire
Logistics companies of the United Kingdom
Transport operators of the United Kingdom
Transport companies established in 1925
1925 establishments in England
Companies listed on the London Stock Exchange